Perdition may refer to:

 Hell in Christianity

Music
 Perdition City, an album by Norwegian band Ulver
 The Perdition EP, an album by Norwegian band Enslavement of Beauty
 "Perdition", a song from the album In Consequence by Greek progressive rock band Phase
 "Perdition", a song from the nu metalcore album Villain by American band Attila

Other uses
 Perdition (play), by Jim Allen
 Perdition Peak, a summit in Washington state, US

See also
 Son of perdition, a phrase associated with a demoniacal title in the New Testament
 The Axis of Perdition, a British group
 Road to Perdition (comics), a series of fictional works by Max Allan Collins
 Road to Perdition, a film based on the graphic novel
 Road to Perdition (soundtrack), music from the film
 "Ghost of Perdition", from the album Ghost Reveries by Swedish progressive metal band Opeth
 "Throes of Perdition", from the progressive metalcore/thrash metal album Shogun by American band Trivium
 "Postcards from Perdition", bonus track from (some editions of) the album Brief Nocturnes and Dreamless Sleep by American progressive rock band Spock's Beard